Mein Waldeck is a German patriotic song and was the anthem of the Waldeck between 1879 and 1929 when Waldeck joined Prussia.

History 

Benjamin Christoph Friedrich Rose (1755–1818) wrote the tune for the poem "Unter dieser Eiche lasst euch nieder" by Philipp Ludwig Bunsen. In 1879, the melody became the unofficial anthem of Waldeck when Princess Emma of Waldeck and Pyrmont married King William III of the Netherlands, and an anthem was needed.

In 1890, August Koch wrote the text of Mein Waldeck to the already existing tune. An anecdote says that Koch and some friends were lampooned during a festival because they were not able to sing a song that praises their native land. In the following weeks, Koch started to write such a song.

Lyrics

See also 
 Auferstanden aus Ruinen
 Bayernhymne
 Deutschlandlied
 Heil dir im Siegerkranz

References

External links 

 Noten (PDF; 29 kB)
 Mein Waldeck on YouTube

German patriotic songs
19th-century songs
Year of song unknown